Forest County is a county in the Commonwealth of Pennsylvania. As of the 2020 census, the population was 6,973, making it the third-least populous county in Pennsylvania. Its county seat is Tionesta. The county was created in 1848 and later organized in 1857.

History
Forest County was created on April 11, 1848, from part of Jefferson County.  The county was enlarged on October 31, 1866, when part of Venango County was incorporated into the county. Forest County was named for the forests contained within its limits.

Geography
It has a warm-summer humid continental climate (Dfb) and average monthly temperatures in Tionesta range from 25.3 °F in January to 69.8 °F in July.

Adjacent counties
Warren County (north)
McKean County (northeast)
Elk County (east)
Jefferson County (south)
Clarion County (south)
Venango County (west)

National protected area
Part of Allegheny National Forest covers Forest County.  Part of Allegheny Islands Wilderness is in Forest County.

State protected area
Part of Cook Forest State Park is in Forest County.
Part of Cornplanter State Forest is in Forest County.

Major highways

Demographics

As of the census of 2000, there were 4,946 people, 2,000 households, and 1,328 families residing in the county.  The population density was 12 people per square mile (4/km2).  There were 8,701 housing units at an average density of 20 per square mile (8/km2).  The racial makeup of the county, largely a result of the SCI Forest State Penitentiary, was 77.4% White, 21.1% Black or African American, 0.40% Native American, 0.14% Asian, 0.69% from other races, and 0.61% from two or more races.  1.21% of the population were Hispanic or Latino of any race. 40.5% English or Welsh, 14.4% were of German, 10.1% Irish, 12.5% American, 10.1% Irish, 6.8% Scotch-Irish, 2.4% Dutch, and 2.2% French ancestry.

There were 2,000 households, out of which 23.20% had children under the age of 18 living with them, 55.70% were married couples living together, 6.70% had a female householder with no husband present, and 33.60% were non-families. 29.10% of all households were made up of individuals, and 15.10% had someone living alone who was 65 years of age or older.  The average household size was 2.29 and the average family size was 2.81.

In the county, the population was spread out, with 22.70% under the age of 18, 5.90% from 18 to 24, 22.60% from 25 to 44, 28.90% from 45 to 64, and 19.90% who were 65 years of age or older.  The median age was 44 years. For every 100 females there were 111.20 males.  For every 100 females age 18 and over, there were 102.30 males.

2020 Census

Law and government

|}

Voter Registration
As of February 21, 2022, there are 3,344 registered voters in Forest County.

 Democratic: 1,014 (30.32%)
 Republican: 1,953 (58.40%)
 Independent: 218 (6.52%)
 Third Party: 159 (4.75%)

State Senate
 Scott E. Hutchinson, Republican, Pennsylvania's 21st Senatorial District

State House of Representatives
 Donna Oberlander, Republican, Pennsylvania's 63rd Representative District
 Kathy L. Rapp, Republican, Pennsylvania's 65th Representative District

United States House of Representatives
 Glenn Thompson, Republican, Pennsylvania's 15th congressional district

United States Senate
 Bob Casey, Jr., Democrat
 John Fetterman, Democrat

Education
The Forest Area School District serves the entire Forest County.

Private schools
Cornell Abraxas I Arlene Lissner (9th-12th) Marienville

Libraries
Marienville Area Library - Marienville 
Sarah Stewart Bovard Memorial Library - Tionesta

Communities

Under Pennsylvania law, there are four types of incorporated municipalities: cities, boroughs, townships, and, in at most two cases, towns. The following boroughs and townships are located in Forest County:

Borough
Tionesta (county seat)

Townships

Barnett
Green
Harmony
Hickory
Howe
Jenks
Kingsley
Tionesta

Census-designated place
Marienville

Unincorporated communities

Clarington
Cooksburg‡
East Hickory
Endeavor
Porkey
West Hickory

Population ranking
The population ranking of the following table is based on the 2010 census of Forest County. The jump in census figures between the 2000 and 2010 census, is due in a large part to the opening of the State Correctional Institution - Forest (SCI - Forest) in October 2004. SCI Forest houses approximately 2,200 inmates at their facility in Marienville, PA.

† county seat

See also
 National Register of Historic Places listings in Forest County, Pennsylvania

References

 
1857 establishments in Pennsylvania
Populated places established in 1857
Counties of Appalachia